The FIS Nordic World Ski Championships 2001 took place February 15–25, 2001 in Lahti, Finland for a record sixth time, previous events being held in 1926, 1938, 1958, 1978 and 1989. These championships also saw the most event changes since the 1950s with the 5 km women and 10 km men's events being discontinued, the 10 km women and 15 km men's events return to their normal status for the first time since the 1991 championships, the debut of a combined pursuit as a separate category (5 km + 5 km for women, 10 km + 10 km for men), the addition of the individual sprint race for both genders, and the debut of the ski jumping team normal hill event. Extremely cold weather cancelled the women's 30 km event. The biggest controversy occurred when a doping scandal hit the host nation of Finland, resulting in six disqualifications. This would serve as a prelude to further doping cases in cross country skiing at the Winter Olympics in Salt Lake City the following year.

Men's cross-country

1 km individual sprint 
February 21. 2001

15 km classical 
February 15, 2001

Finnish skier Jari Isometsä finished fourth, but was disqualified for using plasma expanders.

10 km + 10 km combined pursuit 

February 17, 2001

Finland's Jari Isometsä finished second, but was disqualified for using of plasma expanders.

30 km classical 
February 19, 2001

50 km freestyle 
February 25, 2001

4 × 10 km relay
February 22, 2001

The Finnish team finished first, but was disqualified when Janne Immonen, Mika Myllylä and Harri Kirvesniemi tested positive for doping.

Women's cross-country

1 km individual sprint 
February 21, 2001

10 km classical 
February 20, 2001

5 km + 5 km combined pursuit 
February 18, 2001

15 km classical 
February 15, 2001

4 × 5 km relay
February 23, 2001

The Finnish relay team finished second, but was disqualified when Milla Jauho and Virpi Kuitunen were tested positive for doping.

Men's Nordic combined

7.5 km sprint
February 24, 2001

15 km Individual Gundersen
February 15, 2001

Vik becomes the first repeat world champion in this event since Oddbjørn Hagen did it in 1934 and 1935.

4 × 5 km team
February 20, 2001

Men's ski jumping

Individual normal hill 
February 23, 2001

Individual large hill 
February 19, 2001

Team normal hill
February 25, 2001

Team large hill
February 21, 2001

Doping controversy

The 2001 Doping Scandal in Lahti (fi) saw six Finnish cross-country skiers testing positive for doping, referred to as the "Lahti Six".

On 18 February, Jari Isometsä tested positive for use of hydroxyethyl starch (HES), a banned blood plasma expander. The test was carried out after the 15 km classical race, before the 10+10 km pursuit where Isometsä placed second. Isometsä admitted to using the HES product Hemohes and was immediately suspended.

The Finnish relay teams won gold in the men's race and silver in the women's race. However, it was revealed on 25 February, the last day of the championships, that Janne Immonen also had tested positive for using HES. This led to the disqualification of the men's relay team (Norway thus won the gold medal). After further testing, four more cross-country skiers provided positive doping tests: Harri Kirvesniemi and Mika Myllylä, Milla Jauho and Virpi Kuitunen. The Finnish women's relay team was thus also disqualified, although Kuitunen was allowed to retain her gold medal in the 5+5 km pursuit. Kirvesniemi retired while the others served two year suspensions. The revelations led to the resignation of the medical staff of the cross-country team, and also the team leadership such as head coach Kari-Pekka Kyrö.

Coinciding with the doping tests, Finnish newspaper Helsingin Sanomat revealed on 26 February that a woman had found a suspicious bag at a petrol station near Helsinki Airport. The bag contained several vials with what was later revealed to be HES-products and other products such as adrenaline and asthma medicines. The incident occurred after the last World Cup races before the championships, held in Otepää in Estonia only a week before the opening.

This incident, along with the doping disqualifications of Olga Danilova, Larisa Lazutina, and Johann Mühlegg at the 2002 Winter Olympics in Salt Lake City and Kaisa Varis at the FIS Nordic World Ski Championships 2003 in Val di Fiemme, would force the International Olympic Committee and the International Ski Federation to tighten up their drug testing procedures. Incidentally, all of these skiers took individual medals during the 2001 championships. Varis was also part of the disqualified Finnish women's relay team in 2001, although she retained an individual bronze medal.

Doping concerns were also strongly mentioned at the opening and closing ceremonies of the 2006 Winter Olympics in Turin.

Medal table
Medal winners by nation.

References

FIS 2001 Cross country results
FIS 2001 Nordic combined results
FIS 2001 Ski jumping results
March 14, 2003 announcement of Finnish skier Kaisa Varis's drug test failure. Details on 2001 skiers.

External links

FIS Nordic World Ski Championships
Nordic Skiing
2001 in Finnish sport
2001 in Nordic combined
2001 in cross-country skiing
2001 in ski jumping
February 2001 sports events in Europe
Nordic skiing competitions in Finland
Sports competitions in Lahti